Joomyeong Kim is a Russell Thompson, Jr. Family Professor of Biology at Louisiana State University. His research interests include genomic imprinting and epigenetics. Dr. Kim's laboratory is mainly involved in understanding the functions and regulatory mechanisms governing genes subject to genomic imprinting. Having previously characterized an imprinted domain located on proximal mouse chromosome 7/ human chromosome 19q13.4, his laboratory currently focuses on understanding regulatory mechanisms directing the mono-allelic expression of the seven imprinted genes in the cluster: Peg3, Usp29, Zfp264, APeg3 (paternally expressed) and  Zim1, Zim2, Zim3 (maternally expressed). As a second project direction, his lab studies the function of the dominant gene in the cluster, Peg3, as a transcriptional regulator. Past projects in the Kim lab have included studying the epigenetic instability of imprinted genes during tumorigenesis, potential roles of AEBP2 as a PRC2 targeting protein and in neural crest cell development, as well as the DNA methylation of mouse and human retrotransposons.

Education 

 Ph.D. Biochemistry and Molecular Biology, LSU Medical Center at New Orleans, LA (Advisor, Dr. Prescott L. Deininger)
 M.S. Microbiology, Seoul National University, Seoul, South Korea (Advisor, Dr. John Jeongbin Yim) (1988)
 B.S. Microbiology, Seoul National University, Seoul, South Korea (1986)

Selected publications

References

External links 

 Joomyeong Kim Lab

Living people
South Korean molecular biologists
21st-century American biologists
American molecular biologists
Louisiana State University faculty
Louisiana State University alumni
Seoul National University alumni
Lawrence Livermore National Laboratory staff
Year of birth missing (living people)